Captain Lawrence Percy Story Orr (16 September 1918 – 11 July 1990) was an Ulster Unionist politician in Northern Ireland.  He was Member of Parliament (MP) for South Down from 1950 until he retired at the October 1974 general election, preceding Enoch Powell.

Bio 
Orr was born at 2 Ulster Terrace in Belfast on 16 September 1918, the son of clerk William Robert Macauley Orr and Evelyn Sarah Storey.

He was later chairman of the Ulster Unionist MPs in the House of Commons from 1964 to 1974 and also Imperial Grand Master of the Orange Order.

He defended the influence of Orangemen in the UUP, saying they are "neither bigoted nor uncharitable ... we do not seek to injure or upbraid a man on account of his religious opinions ... and that they treated those who differed from them with all the common courtesies of a civilised community."  Orr warned members not to "follow any narrow-minded part or copy the medieval Roman church in restricting the liberty of conscience of our members."

He also resisted attempts by Westminster to interfere in Northern Ireland's affairs. He married Jean Hughes and she bore five children, William, Mary, John, Robin and Christopher. He had two other sons, James and Daniel

References 
Times Guide to the House of Commons, February 1974
Irish News, July 13, 1968
News Letter
http://www.ark.ac.uk/elections/dsd.htm. Retrieved 4 June 2017

External links 

1918 births
1990 deaths
Military personnel from Belfast
Members of the Parliament of the United Kingdom for County Down constituencies (since 1922)
Ulster Unionist Party members of the House of Commons of the United Kingdom
UK MPs 1950–1951
UK MPs 1951–1955
UK MPs 1955–1959
UK MPs 1959–1964
UK MPs 1964–1966
UK MPs 1966–1970
UK MPs 1970–1974
UK MPs 1974
British Life Guards officers
East Lancashire Regiment officers
British Army personnel of World War II